Law of the Jungle is a 1942 American adventure film directed by Jean Yarbrough.

Plot 
A singer, Nona Brooks, is stranded at a hotel in Africa because her passport is missing. It turns out enemy agents, in collaboration with hotel owner Simmons, have stolen her papers, then try to use her for their nefarious schemes.

Brooks flees and encounters paleontologist Larry Mason in the jungle. He and his assistant Jefferson Jones give her shelter, then fend off unfriendly natives while Simmons is murdered by the villainous agents. All looks hopeless until the tribal chief turns out to be a reasonable, Oxford-educated man who helps Larry and Nona out of their jam.

Cast 
Arline Judge as Nona Brooks
John 'Dusty' King as Larry Mason
Mantan Moreland as Jefferson 'Jeff' Jones
Arthur O'Connell as Simmons
C. Montague Shaw as Sgt. Burke
Guy Kingsford as Constable Whiteside
Laurence Criner as Chief Mojobo - an Oxford Graduate
Victor Kendall as Grozman
Feodor Chaliapin, Jr. as Belts
Martin Wilkins as Bongo

Soundtrack 
 Arline Judge - "Jungle Moon" (Written by Edward J. Kay as Edward Kay)

External links 

1942 films
1940s English-language films
American black-and-white films
1942 adventure films
1940s romance films
American romance films
Monogram Pictures films
American adventure films
Films directed by Jean Yarbrough
1940s American films